The 1985 All-Ireland Senior Club Camogie Championship for the leading clubs in the women's team field sport of camogie was won by Crumlin Cuchulainns from Dublin), who defeated Athenry from Galway in the final, played at O'Toole Park. Crumlin fielded half the Dublin team that won the 1984 All-Ireland senior championship.

Arrangements
The championship was organised on the traditional provincial system used in Gaelic Games since the 1880s, with Éire Óg and Eglish winning the championships of the other two provinces.

The Final
Galway inter-county star Mary Keane was one of Crumlin’s stars against Athenry in the final.

Final stages

References

External links
 Camogie Association

1985 in camogie
1985